Kevin Alan Chappell (born July 8, 1986) is an American professional golfer who is currently playing on the PGA Tour.

Amateur career
Chappell was born in Fresno, California. He attended the University of California, Los Angeles where he won the Jack Nicklaus Award as the collegiate player of the year in 2008. He also won the Arnold Palmer Award for claiming the NCAA championship. He was a PING first-team All-American and Pac-10 golfer of the year in 2008 after winning three collegiate titles and held the UCLA single season scoring record. He was a three-time PING All-American selection. He was ranked the third best amateur in world golf at the end of the 2008 season.

Chappell represented the United States as a member of the championship team at the 2004 Junior World Team Championship and the 2007 Fuji Xerox USA vs. Japan Collegiate Golf Championship. He was also a member of the 2008 U.S Palmer Cup team.

Professional career
Chappell turned professional the day after the 2008 Palmer Cup and began playing mainly on the Nationwide Tour. A stand out result early in his career on the PGA Tour was at the 2009 AT&T Pebble Beach National Pro-Am where he finished tied for sixth. Chappell won his first professional event at the 2010 Fresh Express Classic at TPC Stonebrae on the Nationwide Tour, winning by one stroke over David Hearn after a final round of 65. He finished the year 9th on the money list and earned his 2011 PGA Tour card.

In his rookie season on tour, Chappell finished tied for second behind Brendan Steele at the 2011 Valero Texas Open, after a bogey on the 17th hole put him one stroke behind. This was Chappell's best ever career finish on the PGA Tour to date. In 2011, he also qualified for the U.S. Open, his first ever major championship appearance and he shot a 66 on Sunday to finish in a tie for third place and ensure himself of entry into the 2012 U.S. Open and Masters Tournament. He also finished in a tied for the third place in his final event of the season, the Children's Miracle Network Hospitals Classic. He ended the year 84th in the FedEx Cup standings.

Chappell finished tied for tenth at his second consecutive U.S. Open in 2012; it was his only top-10 finish of 2012 and he finished the season 125th on the money list, earning the last available Tour card based on season earnings. Chappell had his best year on the PGA Tour to date in 2013, making 16 cuts, with three top 10s, which included a second runner-up finish of his career at the Memorial Tournament. He ended the year 45th on the FedEx Cup standings. During the 2014 and 2015, Chappell was consistent, making the majority of cuts he played in, but only recorded three top-10 finishes in this period.

The 2016 season was an inconsistent but impressive season for Chappell with a number of missed cuts and lower place finishes. However, he has finished runner-up three times at the RSM Classic behind Kevin Kisner, at the Arnold Palmer Invitational, a single shot behind Jason Day, and at The Players Championship, again behind Jason Day. He lost in a three-man playoff with Rory McIlroy and Ryan Moore at the Tour Championship to McIlroy.

After 180 PGA Tour starts and six runner-up finishes, Chappell earned his first win at the 2017 Valero Texas Open. Chappell birdied the 72nd hole for a one-stroke win over Brooks Koepka. The win also moved Chappell to a career high 23rd in the Official World Golf Ranking. Chappell also earned the tenth and final automatic position for the 2017 Presidents Cup.

In November 2018, Chappell announced that he had been playing through injury for most of the 2018 season, and now needed microdiscectomy surgery. After finishing top-30 in FedEx Cup points in both 2016 and 2017, Chappell only managed to finish 83rd in 2018. Chappell was given 23 starts to fulfill a medical exemption for the next season.

Chappell made his return to the PGA Tour in September 2019 at the Military Tribute at The Greenbrier. In the second round, he tied the tour record with nine consecutive birdies and shot the 10th round of 59 (–11), and the 11th under 60, in PGA Tour history.

Scorecard 
September 13, 2019

Professional wins (2)

PGA Tour wins (1)

PGA Tour playoff record (0–1)

Web.com Tour wins (1)

Results in major championships
Results not in chronological order in 2020.

CUT = missed the half-way cut
"T" = tied
NT = No tournament due to the COVID-19 pandemic

Summary

Most consecutive cuts made – 4 (2011 U.S. Open – 2013 U.S. Open)
Longest streak of top-10s – 1 (four times)

Results in The Players Championship

CUT = missed the halfway cut
"T" indicates a tie for a place

Results in World Golf Championships

QF, R16, R32, R64 = Round in which player lost in match play
"T" = Tied

U.S. national team appearances
Amateur
Junior World Team Championship: 2004
USA vs. Japan Collegiate Golf Championship: 2007
Palmer Cup: 2008

Professional
Presidents Cup: 2017 (winners)

See also
2010 Nationwide Tour graduates
Lowest rounds of golf

References

External links

American male golfers
UCLA Bruins men's golfers
PGA Tour golfers
Korn Ferry Tour graduates
Golfers from California
Sportspeople from Fresno, California
1986 births
Living people